Muglbach is a river of Bavaria, Germany and the Czech Republic. It flows into the Wondreb (Odrava) near Cheb.

See also
List of rivers of Bavaria

References

Rivers of Bavaria
Rivers of the Karlovy Vary Region
Rivers of the Upper Palatine Forest
Rivers of Germany
International rivers of Europe